Nikolay Yuryevich Anokhin, is a contemporary Russian artist from Moscow, born in 1966. He graduated from the Moscow Art School, and then from Surikov Moscow Art Institute. From 1988 to 1992 he took art courses from Members of the Russian Academy of Arts painters Aleksei Gritsai and Sergei Tkachev. Anokhin's works have been displayed at a number of exhibitions both in Russia and abroad. His younger brother Vladimir is also a classically trained painter.

Anokhin's style represents the evolution of the classic  traditions of Russian painting, including elements of academic  and traditional painting.

Selected works

References

Exhibition of contemporary Russian artists titled “God’s land” opened in Vatican

Online Gallery of works by Nikolay Anokhin

"Terra del Signore": mostra di pittura russa in Vaticano
Il Vaticano, cuore della cultura eterna

See also
List of Russian artists

1966 births
20th-century Russian painters
Russian male painters
21st-century Russian painters
Russian landscape painters
Artists from Moscow
Living people
20th-century Russian male artists
21st-century Russian male artists